{{Infobox school
| image                 = 
| caption               = Classical Gymnasium in Split 54ž
| name                  = Classical Gymnasium in Split 54ž
| native_name           = Klasična gimnazija u Splitu 54ž
| latin_name            = Gymnasium Classicum Spalatense 54ž
| motto                 = 
| schoolmaster          = 
| type                  = Public
| established           = 10 november 1817
| age range             = 
| enrollment            = 
| location              = 
| city                  = Split
| country               = Croatia
| coordinates           = 
| religious_affiliation = 
| language              = 
| nickname              = "Klasična" ˝54ž˝
| song                  = Gaudeamus
| information           = 
| website               = 
}}
The Classical Gymnasium was  a gymnasium high school (similar to a grammar school in England and Wales) situated in Split, Dalmatia, Croatia. It was founded by the Austrian Empire and its Imperial Royal General Government in Dalmatia in 1817. Dalmatian Government, in fact, seceded the public part of the Archidiocesan Classical Gymnasium, founded by archbishop Stefano Cosmi in 1700.

Programme
The program lasted six years till 1848. As the lyceum was added, the program lasted eight years till 1967. From 1963 on the first four years were relocated in the eight year elementary school, so the program of the remaining classes lasted four years.

The program after World War II was based on combining classical education, with emphasis on humanities (namely languages including Latin and Ancient Greek, and mainly English among foreign languages, philosophy, literature, history, fine art, music and theatre, mathematics, natural sciences and extracurricular activities.

The school reform in 1977 abolished gymnasiums from the school system and Classical gymnasium ceased to exist. Its program was reimplemented since 1991 in the classical section of I. gimnazija in Split.

The 200th anniversary of the Classical Gymnasium in Split was celebrated 25 May 2017 with a symposium in Split.Znanstveni skup i svečana akademija ‘’200. obljetnica podržavljenja Klasične gimnazije u Splitu

People associated with Classical Gymnasium in Split
Among the professors were prominent Croatian cultural actors, among the others Natko Nodilo, Šime Ljubić, don Frane Bulić, Eugen Kumičić, Milan Rešetar, Vladimir Nazor, Milan Begović during the 19th century, and then Josip Barač,  Mirko Deanović, Antun Dobronić, Josip Hatze, Vjekoslav Rosenberg-Ružić, Ivo Krešić-Jurić, Petar Kurir, Žarko Muljačić.

Among the graduates there were Francesco Carrara, Niccolò Tommaseo, Antonio Bajamonti, Frane Lappenna, Dujam Rendić-Miočević, Vid Morpurgo,  Giovanni Maver, Jakov Gotovac, Mate Ujević, Kruno Prijatelj, Bogdan Žižić, Igor Zidić, Igor Mandić, Vinko Cuzzi, Tonko Maroević,  Inoslav Bešker.

References

SourcesSpomenica 150-godišnjice Klasične gimnazije u Splitu : 1817-1967, Split, 1967
 Split: posljednji klasičari na okupu nakon trideset godina, Slobodna Dalmacija'' 29.06.2008
I. gimnazija Split – Povijest škole

External links

Educational institutions established in 1817
Schools in Croatia
Education in Split, Croatia
Gymnasiums in Croatia
Buildings and structures in Split, Croatia